Gypsonoma salicicolana is a species of moth of the family Tortricidae. It is found in North America, where it has been recorded from Quebec to Florida, west through Texas to California and north to Alberta.

The length of the forewings is 4.3-6.2 mm. The forewings are dark greyish brown from the base to the antemedial line. The postmedial band is also dark greyish brown and crosses the wing. The median band and subterminal band are paler yellowish brown. The hindwings are uniform greyish brown. The main flight period is May to July.

The larvae feed on leaves of Salix species, including Salix cordata, Salix humilis, and Salix interior.

References

Moths described in 1864
Eucosmini